Yaru Quechua is a dialect cluster of Quechua, spoken in the Peruvian provinces of Pasco and Daniel Alcides Carrión and neighboring areas in northern Junín and Lima department.

The branch of Yaru which has been best described is Tarma Quechua, by Willem F. H. Adelaar in his 1977 Tarma Quechua: Grammar, texts, dictionary. Tarma Quechua is spoken in the districts of Tarma, Huaricolca, Acobamba, La Unión Leticia, Palca, Palcamayo, Tapo, Huasahuasi and San Pedro de Cajas in Junín region, Peru. (See North Junín Quechua.)

References

Bibliography 
 Adelaar, Willem. The Languages of the Andes. With the collaboration of P.C. Muysken. Cambridge language survey. Cambridge University Press, 2007, 

Languages of Peru
Quechuan languages